Manning Rangers is a now defunct South African football club based in Durban. The side is best remembered as the Champions of the Inaugural season of South Africa's Premier Soccer League.

History
The club was founded in 1928 by GR Naidoo who, as well as administering the club, played as its goalkeeper and was later a referee. In the mid-1960s, the club entered the professional ranks under the auspices of the South African Soccer League. In 1985, the club moved its base from Curries Fountain to Chatsworth. The club entered the 1st Division of the NSL (National Soccer League) in 1991.

In 2006, the club declared bankruptcy. The Fidentia Group purchased the club in 2007 and renamed it the Fidentia Rangers. The new owners moved the club from Durban to Cape Town.

The club was near the rent office in Chatsworth

1996/1997 season
In 1996/97 the inaugural season of the Premier Soccer League, the unfancied Maulers then under the leadership of chairman Kaycee Reddy, stunned everybody with a fairy tale season and managed an impressive 23–5–6 record finishing top of the table with 74 points and becoming champions ahead bigger clubs such as the Kaizer Chiefs, Mamelodi Sundowns and Orlando Pirates.

The club remained in the Premier Soccer League for several seasons. In 1998/99 the team represented South Africa in the CAF Champions League losing out to eventual winners ASEC Abidjan of Cote d'Ivoire.

Legacy
The club has since resurfaced in Chatsworth under the name Rangers FC on a semi-professional basis. The team is currently one league below the National 1st Division.

Notable players
 Mark Davies Most appearances for the club.
 Simon Makhubela Most goals for the club.
 Keryn Jordan Most goals in a season for the club with 22.
 Innocent Chikoya Most games in a single season with 43
 Gilbert Mushangazhike Zimbabwean international striker.
 Bruce Grobbelaar Zimbabwean international goalkeeper, coach 2004–05.
 George Koumantarakis South African internationalist and 1995 Title winner.
 Neil Tovey African Cup of Nations winning Bafana Bafana captain.
 Paulito Mozambican international.
 Anthony Tokpah Liberian international goalkeeper.
 Selvanathan Reddy Manning Rangers F.C Striker.

Major honours
PSL Champions 1996/97
Osman Spice Works Cup 1985
FPL Knockout Winners 1979, 89
Coca-Cola Shield 1977

 

Association football clubs established in 1928
Former Premier Soccer League clubs
Soccer clubs in Durban
Defunct soccer clubs in South Africa
1928 establishments in South Africa
2006 disestablishments in South Africa